Pseudalbara fuscifascia is a moth in the family Drepanidae. It was described by Watson in 1968. It is found in China (Zhejiang, Sichuan).

The length of the forewings is 13–14 mm for males and 15-16.5 mm for females.

References

Moths described in 1968
Drepaninae
Moths of Asia